Sareng Bou is a 1978 Bangladeshi film directed by Abdullah Al Mamun. The story is based on the novel of the same name by Shahidullah Kaiser. The film received critical acclaim, particularly for the performance given by Kabori Sarwar, who won Bangladesh National Film Award for Best Actress.

Cast
 Kabori Sarwar as Nobitun
 Farooque as Kadom Sareng
 Nazmul Huda Bachchu as Postmaster
 Syed Hasan Imam as Baul
 Golam Mustafa as Kadom's uncle

Music
Abdul Jabbar was the playback singer. He rendered the song "Ore Neel Doriya Amay De Re De Chhariya". The songs were composed by Alam Khan and written by Mukul Chowdhury.

References

External links
 

1978 films
Bengali-language Bangladeshi films
Films scored by Alam Khan
1970s Bengali-language films